The Thirumanimutharu River originates form Manjavadi village in the Shevaroy Mountain Range and flows through the Salem and Namakkal districts of the Indian state of Tamil Nadu. It rises in the Yercaud hills.  Thirumanimutharu River joins the Cauvery at the Nanjai Edayar village in Namakkal.

Places on the river bank
Manjavadi,
Yercaud hills,
Salem City,
Vennandur, Aathumedu, Serukalai, Melsathamboor, Ramadevam, Koodacheri, Pillur, Paramathi
Nanjai Edayar.

See also 
List of rivers of Tamil Nadu

References

See also 

 Salem District
 Namakkal District
 Rivers of Tamilnadu
 Rivers of India
 Cauvery River
 Kurumbapatti Wildlife Sanctuary

Rivers of Tamil Nadu
Namakkal district
Vennandur block
Rivers of India